Demetrius Terrell Williams (born March 28, 1983) is a former American football wide receiver. He was drafted by the Baltimore Ravens in the fourth round of the 2006 NFL Draft. He played college football at Oregon.

Early years
Williams was a SuperPrep All-American and was also a unanimous Long Beach Press-Telegram Best in the West selection. He accumulated 34 catches for 829 yards and 15 touchdowns in his senior year, in addition to returning one punt into the end zone. He played his high school football at perennial national powerhouse, De La Salle.

College career
Williams attended the University of Oregon and became one of the best receivers in Oregon history. His 162 career receptions tied him for 3rd all time, and his 2,660 yards are 4th all time. Williams' 11 games with 100 or more yards receiving is an Oregon record and his 20 career TD catches are good for 4th all time. He majored in Sociology.

Professional career

Baltimore Ravens
After initially being projected as a second round pick, Williams slipped to the 4th round and was the 111th selection in the draft, where he was picked by the Baltimore Ravens. After a strong training camp and an impressive pre-season, Williams became the slot receiver for the Ravens.

During the 2006 season, Williams caught 22 balls for 396 yards (18.0 avg) and 2 touchdowns.  His highlight came in Week 14 against the Cleveland Browns where he caught a 77-yard pass for a touchdown from Kyle Boller that sealed the game and the win for the Ravens. He also was a huge part of the (at the time) franchise record comeback win over the Tennessee Titans, where he caught 4 passes for 75 yards to help the Ravens overcome a 26-17 deficit and win the game 27-26. He finished the season with the (at that time) franchise best 18 yards per catch average for a Ravens rookie.

Coming into the 2007 season, he was expected to take a huge leap forward as the Ravens "deep threat" receiver, and looked to fulfill that promise with 18 receptions for 267 yards, before being eventually derailed by injury and put on IR after Week 9. He attempted to make a comeback in the 2008 season, once again looking to become the Ravens' big play-maker and stretch the field. After shaking off a little rust, he began to heat up near mid-season with a few big catches, including a 70 touchdown reception against the Oakland Raiders in Week 7. However, he was also unable to continue after that play, with pain from bone spurs in his leg that eventually put him on IR for the season, once again, after surgery.

The Ravens didn't draft any big receivers in the 2009 off-season, with general manager Ozzie Newsome stating that they had faith in the receivers they had, and that they were sticking with Williams as their field stretching player. Unfortunately, the injury bug would pop up yet again, this time with only a minor injury during the pre-season, but it was enough to keep him out a game, and give other players time to shine. Though he returned would return, and in the final game of the pre-season posted 4 catches for 77 yards, once again showing his downfield ability, the Ravens ultimately chose to go with Kelley Washington #3 receiver. Due to offensive coordinator Cam Cameron typically only using three receiver sets, this meant that Demetrius saw little to no playing time for over half the 2009 season. Washington went down with injury in a Week 13 matchup with the Detroit Lions, and Williams stepped in and made 2 catches for 45 yds. in a 48-3 rout. The following week, he again showed his promise as a playmaker, with 4 catches for 71 yards and a touchdown against the Chicago Bears. He remained active for the rest of the season, but Washington returned in the following weeks, retaking his #3 spot. Many fans openly wondered at the logic of not playing a speedy receiver like Williams, when the 2009 Ravens ranked near the bottom of the league in yards per catch, and yards after catch.

Though he remained with the team and worked hard in the 2010 Ravens off-season programs, he was ultimately cut in August 2010 after the Ravens had signed Donté Stallworth. Ironically, the Ravens had signed Stallworth to take Williams' former role as deep threat receiver, yet he himself would be inactive for much of the season with an injury. Williams finished his Ravens career with a total of 63 receptions, 1,008 yards, and four touchdowns on a 16.0 yard receiving average.

Cleveland Browns
Demetrius Williams signed with the Cleveland Browns on October 26, 2010. He was targeted twice in a loss to his old team (the Ravens) but saw little playing time overall, and ended the season without a reception. He did, however, see playing time on Cleveland's special teams unit. His contract was terminated on September 3, 2011.

Jacksonville Jaguars
Williams was signed by the Jacksonville Jaguars on August 12, 2012 and later released on August 31.

Sacramento Mountain Lions
He played for the Sacramento Mountain Lions of the United Football League for the 2012 season.

References

External links
Just Sports Stats
Baltimore Ravens bio
Cleveland Browns bio
Jacksonville Jaguars bio
Sacramento Mountain Lions bio

1983 births
Living people
People from Concord, California
Players of American football from California
American football wide receivers
Oregon Ducks football players
Baltimore Ravens players
Cleveland Browns players
Jacksonville Jaguars players
Sacramento Mountain Lions players
Sportspeople from the San Francisco Bay Area
De La Salle High School (Concord, California) alumni